Cunila is a genus of plants in the Lamiaceae, first described in 1759. It is native to North and South America.

Species
Cunila angustifolia Benth. - southern Brazil, Misiones Province of Argentina
Cunila crenata García-Peña & Tenorio - State of Durango in Mexico
Cunila fasciculata Benth. - southern Brazil
Cunila galioides Benth. - Brazil
Cunila incana Benth. - southern Brazil, Argentina
Cunila incisa Benth. - southern Brazil
Cunila leucantha Kunth ex Schltdl. & Cham. - Mexico (Veracruz,  Guerrero, Oaxaca, Chiapas), Central America (Guatemala, El Salvador, Honduras, Panama)
Cunila lythrifolia Benth. - central + southern Mexico
Cunila menthiformis Epling - southern Brazil
Cunila menthoides Benth. - Uruguay
Cunila microcephala Benth. - southern Brazil, Argentina, Uruguay
Cunila origanoides (L.) Britton - central + eastern United States from Texas and Kansas east to New York and Georgia
Cunila platyphylla Epling - southern Brazil
Cunila polyantha Benth. - Mexico (from Zacatecas and Jalisco south to Chiapas), Central America (Guatemala, Honduras, Panama)
Cunila pycnantha B.L.Rob. & Greenm. - Mexico (from Sinaloa and Durango south to Chiapas)
Cunila ramamoorthiana M.R.Garcia-Pena - Mexico (Guerrero)
Cunila spicata Benth. - southern Brazil, Argentina, Uruguay, Paraguay
Cunila tenuifolia Epling - southern Brazil

References

Lamiaceae
Lamiaceae genera